The General is a 1992 Russian biographical war film directed by Igor Nikolayev about officer Alexander Gorbatov.

Plot
March 1941. Sentenced to a long-term prison of the communists, Gorbatov is released from Lubyanka and shortly afterwards rules the unit on the front. He is a capable commander and is quickly promoted — soon he is a general-lieutenant and commands the army. Compared with other Soviet commanders, including Zhukov himself, he is distinguished by understanding the realities of the modern battlefield, the independence of courts and decisions and the ability to persuade his superiors to them. The war continues, and Gorbatov constantly comes to face not only the German invaders, but also the omnipotence of political officers, the ignorance of commanders ...

Cast
 Vladimir Gostyukhin — Alexander Gorbatov
 Irina Akulova — Nina Alexandrovna Gorbatova, wife
 Aleksei Zharkov — Lev Mekhlis
 Alexander Khochinsky — Boris Pasternak
 Vladimir Menshov — Georgy Zhukov
 Igor Shapovalov — Semyon Timoshenko
 Eugene Karelskikh — Konstantin Rokossovsky
 Vasily Popov — Leontiy Guriev
 Svetlana Konovalova — Tatyana Yurievna, widow of the commander Konstantin Ushakov
 Vladimir Romanovsky — Nikita Khrushchev

References

External links
 
 

Russian war drama films
1990s war drama films
Cultural depictions of Georgy Zhukov
Cultural depictions of Nikita Khrushchev
1992 films
1990s Russian-language films
1990s German-language films
Eastern Front of World War II films
Russian World War II films